Sparrows Point is the 1992 debut album of singer-songwriter Richard Shindell.

Track listing
 "Are You Happy Now?" – 3:49 
 "Castaway" – 3:55 
 "By Now" – 5:16
 "The Courier" – 4:18 
 "Sparrows Point" – 4:47 
 "The Kenworth of My Dreams" – 3:44 
 "On a Sea of Fleur-de-Lis" – 4:22 
 "Memory of You" – 3:38 
 "You Again" – 2:59 
 "Nora" – 3:59 
 "Howling at the Trouble" – 3:42

Personnel
Musicians:
 Richard Shindell – vocals, acoustic and electric guitar
 Steve Addabbo – electric guitar, harmony
 Greg Anderson – bass, cittern, electric guitar
 Chris Bishop – bass
 Kenneth Blevins – drums
 Larry Campbell – pedal steel, banjo, violin
 Diane Chodkowski – harmony
 Mark Dann – bass
 John Gorka – harmony
 Mark Hamza – hammond organ
 Jack Hardy – harmony
 Margo Hennebach – hammond organ
 Winifred Horan – violin
 Lucy Kaplansky – harmony
 Joanie Madden – Irish whistle
 Mark McColl – percussion
 Marshall Rosenberg – percussion
 Ilene Weiss – harmony
 Howie Wyeth – drums

Production
Produced by David Seitz and Richard Shindell
tracks 2, 5 & 10 by Steve Addabbo, Richard Shindell & David Seitz
at Synergy Sound, Great Neck, New York
and at Shelter Island Sound, New York City
Mixed by David Seitz, Richard Meyer, Judy Aweiman and Greg Anderson
at Synergy sound
Mastered by Robert Vosgien, CMS Digital

References

External links
 Sparrows Point page at richardshindell.com

1992 debut albums
Richard Shindell albums